Virginia Beach City Football Club (Women) is an American semi-professional women's soccer club based in Norfolk, Virginia playing in the Women's Premier Soccer League (WPSL) in the Colonial Conference of the East Region.

It held its inaugural season in 2015. The Women's club has been put on hiatus since 2019.

Current roster

Source: 2018 Virginia Beach City FC Women's Roster

Stadium
The team plays at the Virginia Beach Sportsplex which is a soccer-specific stadium built in 1999 and seats 6,000.  It was the first soccer-specific stadiums built in the U.S.

Year by Year

Source

Jersey Sponsors 

On February 21, 2018, Virginia Beach City FC and Adidas announced an extension to their long-term partnership through 2021 making Adidas the official supplier for the club.

References

External links
Official team site

Women's soccer clubs in the United States
2015 establishments in Virginia
Women's Premier Soccer League teams
Association football clubs established in 2015
Sports in Virginia Beach, Virginia
Women's sports in Virginia